Patrick Rees Daneker (born January 14, 1976) is a former pitcher in Major League Baseball. He played for the Chicago White Sox in 1999.

Amateur career
A native of Williamsport, Pennsylvania, Daneker attended Loyalsock Township High School and the University of Virginia. In 1995 and 1996, he played collegiate summer baseball with the Wareham Gatemen of the Cape Cod Baseball League and was named a league all-star in 1995.

Professional career
Daneker was selected by the Chicago White Sox in the fifth round of the 1997 MLB Draft and appeared in three major league games for Chicago in 1999.

Coaching career
In 2011, Daneker was hired to be the pitching coach for the Southern Maryland Blue Crabs.

References

External links

1976 births
Living people
Major League Baseball pitchers
Chicago White Sox players
Baseball players from Pennsylvania
Sportspeople from Williamsport, Pennsylvania
Bristol White Sox players
Winston-Salem Warthogs players
Hickory Crawdads players
Birmingham Barons players
Charlotte Knights players
Syracuse SkyChiefs players
St. George Pioneerzz players
West Tennessee Diamond Jaxx players
Iowa Cubs players
Camden Riversharks players
Pennsylvania Road Warriors players
Newark Bears players
Somerset Patriots players
Wareham Gatemen players